Gates of What If? is a role-playing game adventure published by TSR in 1986 for the Marvel Super Heroes role-playing game.

Contents
Gates of What If? is a scenario involving a journey by the Fantastic Four and Spider-Man to a world where Dr. Doom is worshipped as a hero. It includes a color map of the villain's lair, Doomstadt.

Publication history
MH9 Gates of What If? was written by Roger E. Moore, and was published by TSR, Inc., in 1986 as a 40-page book.

Reception

Reviews

References

Marvel Comics role-playing game adventures
Role-playing game supplements introduced in 1986